South End, South-end or Southend may refer to:

Places
In Australia:
Southend, Queensland, a small township on Curtis Island
Southend, South Australia, a town and locality

In Canada:
South End, Halifax, a neighbourhood in Nova Scotia
South End, a neighbourhood in Yarmouth, Nova Scotia
Southend, Saskatchewan

In the United Kingdom
Southend-on-Sea, Essex
London Southend Airport
Southend (UK Parliament constituency)
Southend-on-Sea City Council
Southend, Argyll, Argyll and Bute
South End, Bedfordshire, a location
Southend, Berkshire, in Bradfield
Southend, Brightwalton, a location in Berkshire
Southend, Buckinghamshire, in Turville
South End, Buckinghamshire, in Stewkley
South End, Cumbria, a location
South End, East Riding of Yorkshire, a location
Southend, Gloucestershire, a United Kingdom location
South End, Greenwich, a location, southeast of Eltham, in southeast London.
South End, Hampshire, a location
South-end, Hertfordshire, a settlement in the parish of Much Hadham in England
South End, Lincolnshire, a location
Southend, London, in Lewisham
South End, Norfolk, a location
Southend, Oxfordshire, a United Kingdom location
South End (road), a road in South Croydon, London

In the United States:
South End, Agoura Hills, California, a neighborhood
South End Grounds, three baseball parks within this neighborhood
South End, a neighborhood in Hartford, Connecticut
South End of Stamford, Connecticut
South End, Boston, a neighborhood of Boston, Massachusetts, United States.
South End, Springfield, Massachusetts, an Italian neighborhood in Springfield, Massachusetts
South End, Minnesota, a census-designated place
South End, a neighborhood of Albany, New York
South End (Charlotte neighborhood), North Carolina

Other uses
Southend (band)
The South End, the student newspaper of Wayne State University
Southend Interactive, a video game developer most noted for Deathrow
South End Press, a non-profit book publisher
South End Reservoir, a service reservoir for Singapore Changi Airport
South End Rowing Club

See also

Southend Manor F.C.
Southend United F.C.
Southend-on-Sea (disambiguation)
South (disambiguation)
End (disambiguation)